Eupithecia nusret is a moth in the family Geometridae. It is found in Costa Rica.

References

Moths described in 2004
nusret
Moths of Central America